Vatla Airfield (or Vatla Highway Strip) was an airfield in Vatla, Lääne County, Estonia. The airfield was a backup airfield for Soviet Air Force.

The airfield's length was 2500 m and it was covered with concrete/asphalt.

References

External links
 Vatla Airfield at Forgotten Airfields

Defunct airports in Estonia
Buildings and structures in Lääne County
Soviet Air Force bases
Lääneranna Parish